Reagan Charleston (née Tucker) (born 1988) is an American jewelry designer, lawyer and reality television personality known for appearing on Southern Charm New Orleans.

Early life and education 
Reagan Tucker was born and raised in Mandeville, Louisiana, and is of Louisiana Creole descent. She is a descendant of Mary Peychaud, a member of the family which created Peychaud's Bitters and who is credited with creating the Sazerac cocktail.

Charleston's grandparents and mother were copper sculpture artists and owned an art gallery in the French Quarter. She has stated that her family background in art inspired her to become a jewelry designer. 

In 2015, she began attending Loyola University New Orleans College of Law, and graduated on May 12, 2018.

Career

Jewelry design 
Charleston founded Reagan Charleston Design, a jewelry and fashion accessory company, after returning from a trip to Florence, Italy in 2012. She grew up in her Grandparents art galleries and studios in the French Quarter of New Orleans, where her mother and grandparents made copper sculptures.   She works with her sister, Reina, and mother, Lauren, both artists and metalsmiths. Her designs take inspiration from the culture of New Orleans, as well as European history and architecture, especially Italian, French and Croatian culture. On October 18, 2018 she opened a jewelry shop called Reagan Charleston Jewelry in One Canal Place. In October of 2021, she debuted a collaborative collection with Eugenia Kim with her jewelry adorning the Eugenia Kim hats.

Southern Charm New Orleans 
Reagan and Jeff Charleston became cast members of the reality television series Southern Charm New Orleans in 2017. Reagan Charleston had previously lived in Charleston, South Carolina and was a friend of Whitney Sudler-Smith, the executive producer of Southern Charm. Both Reagan and Jeff reprised their roles in season 2 of Southern Charm New Orleans.

Other work 
Charleston sits on the board of Jennifer Hale's Sideline Pass, and on the style board for One Canal Place. On April 26, 2019 Charleston announced via Instagram that she passed the bar examination in Louisiana. She was also Grand Marshall for the 2020 Krewe of Pandora in the Jefferson Parish Mardi Gras parade.

Personal life 
Reagan married Jeff Charleston in 2012. The couple separated in 2018, and later divorced.

In December 2018 she married Reece Thomas. She decided to keep the last name Charleston because it was on all her professional documents and business. Their daughter Reece Ellis Thomas was born on June 12, 2019. Their son Rexford Vance Thomas was born August 23, 2021.

References

External links 
 

American jewelry designers
Participants in American reality television series
Louisiana Creole people
1988 births
Living people